The Mixtures were an Australian  rock band that formed in Melbourne in 1965.

Biography

1965–1976: The Mixtures
Australian musicians Terry Dean and Rod De Clerk met in Tasmania in 1965. They then met Laurie Arthur, a member of the Strangers, and the three formed a band after a jam session. They signed to EMI that same year and released three singles. They went through several line-up changes over the following few years, then signed to CBS Records in 1969. A few further singles followed before transferring to Fable Records in 1970.

The Mixtures recorded a cover of Mungo Jerry's "In the Summertime" and—as a result of the 1970 radio ban, during which many Australian radio stations refused to play Australian and British music released by major labels—received much more airplay than had initially been expected for a group on a small record label. The single went to #1 in Australia for six weeks. They followed up with "The Pushbike Song" (produced by David Mackay), which went to #1 in Australia for two weeks, hit #2 in the UK Singles Chart, and went to #44 on the Billboard Hot 100 in the U.S. after being released on Sire Records.

The next single, "Henry Ford", peaked at #43 in Australia. Further line-up changes ensued before "Captain Zero" went to #6 in Australia in 1971, their last big hit. Brian Eno guested on synthesiser on "Captain Zero".  The  group underwent some more line-up changes including Brenton Fosdike (guitar, vocals), John Petcovich (drums, vocals) and the last member to join was keyboard player Rob Scott.

The 1976 single, "Skateboard Jive" / "Come Together for the Games" was to be their last and the group folded sometime in 1976.

1977–present: Post The Mixtures
In 1978 the band travelled to Perth to do some recording and put together a new show. During this time bass player Chris Spooner died in a fishing accident at Trigg Beach. The band only carried on for a further three months as a four-piece before breaking up in early 1979. The remaining four members, Brenton, John, Rob and Peter Williams, then formed a new band with two other Australians, (Dennis Broad and Paul Reynolds) and the band was named BRIX.

Fred Wieland, whose tenure with the Mixtures led to an appearance in the United Kingdom TV programme Never Mind the Buzzcocks, died of lung cancer in December 2018 at the age of 75.

Members
Terry Dean (vocals) 1965–?
Laurie Arthur (guitar, vocals) 1965–67
Greg Cook (guitar, vocals) 1970 – March 1971
John Creech (drums, vocals) 1965–70
Rod De Clerk (bass, vocals) 1965–67
Buddy England (vocals) June 1969 – March 1970
Mick Flinn (bass) 1967 – May 1972
Dennis Garcia (organ) 1967
Mick Holden (drums) early 1971
Gary Howard (drums) 1970–71
Alan "Edgell" James (bass) late 1966
Idris Jones (vocals) late 1967 – June 1969; 1970; 1971
Don Lebler (drums) April 1971 - 1976
Chris Spooner (bass) May 1972 - 1978
Fred Wieland (guitar) 1967
Peter Williams (vocals, guitar) 1971–79
Brenton  Fosdike (vocals, guitar) 
John Petcovich (vocals, drums)
Rob Scott (keyboards, vocals)

Discography

Studio albums

Compilations albums

Singles

See also
List of artists who reached number one on the Australian singles chart
Long Way to the Top

References

External links
The Mixtures at milesago.com

Victoria (Australia) musical groups
Musical groups established in 1965
Musical groups disestablished in 1976
Australian pop music groups